Abraham Kirkpatrick Lewis was a pioneer coal miner in Pittsburgh, Pennsylvania.
His namesake was his grandfather, Abraham Kirkpatrick, a colleague of General John Neville.  He graduated from Kenyon College, Ohio, in 1835.  Although he 
studied medicine and law, he made his living in the coal industry.  With William Philpot and John M.Snowden Jr., he was the first to establish a market and furnish a regular supply of Pittsburgh coal to New Orleans, transporting the coal on flatboats.

Coal Mines
His Coal Ridge Mine on Sawmill Run, opened in 1857, was originally served by a horse-drawn tramway, later converted to steam power as the Little Saw Mill Run Railroad.

Kirk Lewis Incline

The Kirk Lewis incline was used to transport coal from "Coal Hill", now known as Mt. Washington, to the Monongahela River. It has been described as the first incline in Pittsburgh.  It was probably built by George W. Roberts Sr., the superintendent of his mines, who was known to have built many coal inclines in the area, including those at Elizabeth, Pennsylvania.

References

1815 births
1860 deaths
Kenyon College alumni
People from Allegheny County, Pennsylvania
Defunct funicular railways in the United States
Railway inclines in Pittsburgh
History of Pittsburgh
Defunct Pennsylvania railroads
Transportation in Pittsburgh